Eremophila lanceolata is a flowering plant in the figwort family, Scrophulariaceae and is endemic to Western Australia. It is a low, spreading shrub with foliage which is shiny when young, angular branches and lilac to purple flowers and which grows in the north-west of Western Australia.

Description
The margins of the leaves often have distinct teeth.

The petal tube is deep lilac to purple on the outside and white with dark purple spots on the inside. The outside of the petal tube is hairy but the inside surface of the lobes is glabrous while the inside of the tube is filled with woolly hairs. The 4 stamens are fully enclosed in the petal tube.
Eremophila lanceolata (flower).jpg

Taxonomy and naming 
The species was first formally described by Robert Chinnock in 2007 and the description was published in Eremophila and Allied Genera: A Monograph of the Plant Family Myoporaceae. The specific epithet (lanceolata) is a Latin word meaning "lance-like".

Distribution and habitat
Eremophila lanceolata occurs in wide area of the Pilbara and south to Karalundi and between Newman and Mount Augustus in the Gascoyne, Gibson Desert, Little Sandy Desert and Pilbara biogeographic regions.

Conservation status
This species is classified as "not threatened" by the Western Australian Government Department of Parks and Wildlife.

Use in horticulture
This eremophila is an attractive small shrub which will grow well in a container and thrive in areas like Sydney or the coast of Victoria. It can be propagated from cuttings or by grafting, prefers a well-drained soil but will grow in either full sun or a partially shaded position. It is drought tolerant, although may need occasional watering if grown in a container but needs protection from frost.

References

Eudicots of Western Australia
lanceolata
Endemic flora of Western Australia
Plants described in 2007
Taxa named by Robert Chinnock